List of stage works by Dimitris Papaioannou

1980s
 The Mountain – Edafos Dance Theatre, 1987
 The Raincoat – Edafos Dance Theatre, 1987
 Room I – Edafos Dance Theatre, 1988
 Room II – Edafos Dance Theatre, 1988

1990s
 The Last Song of Richard Strauss – Edafos Dance Theatre, 1990
 The Songs – Edafos Dance Theatre, 1991
 Moons – Edafos Dance Theatre, 1992
 Medea – Edafos Dance Theatre, 1993
 Iphigeneia at the Bridge of Arta – Edafos Dance Theatre, 1995
 Xenakis' Oresteia – The Aeschylus Suite – Edafos Dance Theatre, 1995
 A Moment’s Silence – Edafos Dance Theatre, 1995
 Nefeli (stage show for Haris Alexiou), 1995
 The Brothers Grimm Fairy Tales – Edafos Dance Theatre, 1996
 Dracula – Edafos Dance Theatre, 1997
 Monument – Edafos Dance Theatre, 1997
 The Storm – Edafos Dance Theatre, 1997
 Volcano (stage show for Alkistis Protopsalti), 1998
 Tree (stage show for Haris Alexiou), 1998
 The Return of Helen (for the Athens Megaron Concert Hall), 1999
 Human Thirst – Edafos Dance Theatre, 1999

2000s
 La Sonnambula (for the Athens Megaron Concert Hall), 2000
 A Tale (stage show for Alkistis Protopsalti), 2000
 For Ever – Edafos Dance Theatre, 2001
 Opening Ceremony – Athens 2004 Olympic Games, 2004
 Closing Ceremony – Athens 2004 Olympic Games, 2004
 Before, 2005
 Black Box, 2005
 2, 2006
 MEDEA2, 2008
 Nowhere, 2009

2010s
 K.K., 2010
 Inside, 2011
 Primal Matter, 2012
Still Life, 2014
ORIGINS – Opening Ceremony – First European Games, Baku 2015 
The Great Tamer, 2017
Seit Sie [Since She], Tanztheater Wuppertal Pina Bausch, 2018

2020
 Transverse Orientation, 2021

External links
DimitrisPapaioannou.com Official Site
Dimitris Papaioannou YouTube Channel (2BlackBox)

Papaioannou